Gold Lake is a freshwater lake located on a valley on the west skirt of Wild Goat Peak, in King County, Washington. Gold Lake is surrounded by prominent peaks and lakes at the heart of the Alpine Lakes Wilderness, including Big Snow Mountain and Iron Cap Mountain.

Waterfalls
The outflow of Gold Lake joins the creeks from Moira Lake, Fools Gold Lake and other snow melting creeks to empty as the inflow of Lake Dorothy, which is the origin of the East Fork of the Miller River. Shortly after the Gold Lake outflow, the creek plunges into an unrated waterfall, Gold Lake Falls.

Access
Access to Gold Lake is through Dutch Miller Gap trail 1030 starting at Dingford Creek gate. The trail leads to a ridge of Big Snow Mountain towards Wild Goat Peak. Gold Lake is on the west side of the ridge, and Chetwoot Lake on the opposite side. The trail passes alongside Hardscrabble Creek and through Hardscrabble Lakes on the south skirt of Hardscrabble Dome. It follows a ridge towards Wild Snow Peak with Gold Lake on the north side of this ridge.

See also 
 List of lakes of the Alpine Lakes Wilderness

References 

Lakes of King County, Washington
Lakes of the Alpine Lakes Wilderness
Okanogan National Forest